Partial melting is the phenomenon that occurs when a rock is subjected to temperatures high enough to cause certain minerals to melt, but not all of them. This process creates a magma that has a higher proportion of the minerals that have melted than the original rock. Partial melting is an important part of the formation of all igneous rocks and some metamorphic rocks (e.g., migmatites), as evidenced by a multitude of geochemical, geophysical and petrological studies.

The parameters that influence partial melting include the composition of the source rock, the pressure and temperature of the environment, and the availability of water or other fluids. The composition of the source rock affects the amount of melting that occurs, as different minerals have different melting points. Pressure and temperature play a major role in the melting process, being important controls in the solidus' and liquidus' temperatures. Finally, the availability of water or other fluids can affect the amount of melting that occurs, as these can reduce melting points. 

Since conduction alone is incapable of heating large masses of rock to the point of melting (with the exception of a few volcanic centers, e. g. Yellowstone), the main processes that govern partial melting are decompression melting and flux melting. Decompression melting occurs when rocks are brought from higher to lower pressure zones in the Earth's crust, lowering the melting point of its mineral components, thus generating a partial melt. Flux melting, on the other hand, occurs when water and other volatiles get in contact with hot rock, reducing the melting point of minerals, thus leading to partial melting.

Partial melting is also linked to the formation of natural resources. Magmatic and hydrothermal ore deposits, such as chromite, Ni-Cu sulfides, rare-metal pegmatites, kimberlites, volcanic-hosted massive sulfide deposits are some examples of valuable natural resources closely related to the conditions of the origin, migration and emplacement of partial melts.

Partial melting of the mantle 
Melting in the mantle requires one of three possible events to occur: an increase in temperature, a decrease in pressure, or the addition of volatiles to the system (a change in composition).

Temperature
In the case of raising the temperature, mantle melting will only occur if the mantle is heated past the normal geotherm. It is believed that heat flux from the core and lower mantle is responsible for increasing the temperature of the upper mantle. Local perturbations of the geothermal gradient, such as hotspots, are not well understood but are considered to be a likely heat source for the mantle. The decay of radioactive elements, though considered to be one of the simplest ways of generating heat in the mantle, is not realistically responsible for mantle melting, as it would take over 10 million years for the radioactive decay of K, U and Th to increase the temperature of peridotite by 1 degree Celsius. Furthermore, even if this process did generate a small fraction of melt, the radioactive elements would concentrate in the melt and escape the system, ultimately halting the process of melt generation.

Pressure 
Melting in the mantle can also occur if there is a sufficient drop in pressure in the system at a given temperature. In order to decrease pressure, mantle rocks must rise to shallower levels, while experiencing a minimal loss of heat to the surroundings. This process can be referred to as adiabatic if the heat loss is zero. As the mass of mantle rock continues to rise through the Earth's layers, it follows a P-T path that may eventually cross the solidus, initiating melting. This melting process is known as decompression melting.

Addition of volatiles 
The presence of volatiles (particularly H2O and CO2) has the potential to significantly reduce solidus temperatures of a given system. This allows for melt to be generated at lower temperatures than otherwise predicted, eliminating the need for a change in pressure or temperature conditions of the system. However, the mantle typically has a very low volatile content and this can limit the amount of melt generated.

Significance 
Partial melting is an important process in geology with respect to the chemical differentiation of crustal rocks. On the Earth, partial melting of the mantle at mid-ocean ridges produces oceanic crust, and partial melting of the mantle and oceanic crust at subduction zones creates continental crust. In all these places partial melting is often associated with volcanism, although some melts do not make it to the surface.  Partial melts are thought to play an important role in enriching old parts of the continental lithosphere in incompatible elements.  Partial melts produced at depth move upwards due to the compaction of the surrounding matrix.

References

Volcanology
Igneous petrology